Heart Signal (Chinese: 心动的信号) is a Chinese dating reality television show distributed by Tencent Video. It is based on the South Korean reality TV show of the same name. Season 1 of the show aired in 2018, followed by season 2 in 2019, season 3 in 2020, and season 4 in 2021.

Rules for the cast 

 Cast members must return to their co-living house every night
 Cast members are not allowed to reveal their birth year nor occupation before the second day
 Cast members are not allowed to directly confess to their love during the stay
 At the end of each day, individual cast members can only send one anonymous text message to one other person of their choice. They are not permitted to disclose their identity in the message
 Cast members can go out on a date with one person of choice with the following additional rules:
 Female cast members name a location of choice for the date, matches are made when male cast members pick from the list of locations proposed by the women
 Cast members are not allowed to tell anyone about the location they chose or pick

Panelists 
Season 1
 Zhu Yawen
 Zhang Yuqi
 Yang Chaoyue
 Jiang Sida
 Guan Hong
 Jiang Zhenyu

Season 2

 Du Haitao
 Victoria Song
 Yang Chaoyue
 Zheng Kai
 Rainie Yang
 Liu Xuan

Season 3

 Du Haitao
 Qi Wei
 Hans Zhang
 Ding Yuxi
 Yang Chaoyue
 Yang Qikun
Season 4

 Du Haitao
 Yang Ying
 Guo Qilin
 Ma Boqian
 Song Zuer
 Li Xueqin

Cast members

References 

Chinese reality television series
2010s reality television series
2020s reality television series
Dating and relationship reality television series
2018 Chinese television series debuts